Francois Safieddine is a nightclub owner in Denver, Colorado who won a World Series of Poker bracelet at the 2007 World Series of Poker's $2,500 No-Limit Hold'em event.  Safieddine, 33, is married and has four children.  He was born in Lebanon and moved to the United States during the 1980s.

As of 2008, Francois Safieddine has tournament winning of over $1,500,000. His 6 cashes as the WSOP account for $644,698 of those winnings.

World Series of Poker bracelets

References

American poker players
Living people
World Series of Poker bracelet winners
Year of birth missing (living people)
Nightclub owners